Gulella antelmeana is a species of very small air-breathing land snail, a terrestrial pulmonate gastropod mollusk in the family Streptaxidae. This species is endemic to Mauritius and Réunion

References 

Gulella
Gastropods described in 1936
Taxonomy articles created by Polbot
Taxa named by Alfred James Peile